KGLE (590 AM) is a radio station licensed to serve Glendive, Montana.  The station is owned by Friends of Christian Radio, Inc. It airs a Religious radio format including programming from Moody Broadcasting Network.

The station was assigned the KGLE call letters by the Federal Communications Commission.

References

External links
KGLE official website

Radio stations established in 1962
1962 establishments in Montana
GLE
Dawson County, Montana
Moody Radio affiliate stations